Portezuelo de Chaxas is a mountain pass through the Cordillera Occidental of the Andes along the border between Chile and Bolivia.

See also 

Mountain passes of Chile
Mountain passes of Bolivia
Mountain passes of the Andes
Landforms of Arica y Parinacota Region
Landforms of Oruro Department